The Mayan Secrets is a Fargo adventure novel. The two main characters of the Fargo novels are adventurers Sam Fargo and his wife, Remi. The Mayan Secrets is the fifth book of the Fargo series. The book's hardcover edition was first published September 3, 2013.

Plot
Husband-and-wife team Sam and Remi Fargo are in Mexico, when they come upon a remarkable discovery—the skeleton of a man clutching an ancient sealed pot, and within the pot, a Mayan codex, larger than anyone has ever seen. The codex contains astonishing information about the Mayans, their cities, and mankind itself. The secrets are so powerful that some people would do anything to possess them—as the Fargos are just about to find out who.

References

2013 American novels
Novels by Clive Cussler
Fargo Adventures
G. P. Putnam's Sons books
Collaborative novels
Novels set in Mexico